King's Highway 38, commonly referred to as Highway 38, was a provincially maintained highway in the Canadian province of Ontario. The  road connected Highway 2 and Highway 401 in Kingston with Highway 7 west of Perth. It was designated in 1934 and remained relatively unchanged throughout its existence, aside from some minor diversions and a rerouting through Kingston as a result of the construction of Highway 401 in the mid-1950s. At the beginning of 1998, the entire highway was transferred to the municipalities of Frontenac County through which it travelled: Kingston, South Frontenac and Central Frontenac. Today the former highway is named Road 38 and Gardiners Road, but is still referred to as Highway 38 by locals.

Route description 

Highway 38 was a south–north route located within Frontenac County in eastern Ontario.
South of Highway 401, the former highway continues as Gardiner's Road, which was decommissioned prior to 1997.

The route of Highway 38 in 1997 began at Exit 611 of Highway 401, and proceeded north across Highway 401 before curving northwest. The former highway passes through a blend of farmland and mixed forests outside of communities as far north as Hartington. Within Kingston, it travels through the community of Glenvale before crossing into South Frontenac Township. It passes through Murvale and crosses Millhaven Creek before turning north. As the former route approaches Harrowsmith, it encounters the Trans Canada Trail, an all-season hiking trail built along the former right-of-way of the Kingston and Pembroke Railway (K&P), which generally parallels the route north of this point.

Continuing northward, the former route of Highway 38 travels through Hartington, then descends into the Canadian Shield. North of this point, the scenery drastically changes, with farmland mostly giving way to dense forests and granite rock outcroppings, and the route meanders around rugged terrain and numerous lakes. It crosses Hardwood Creek as it enters Verona and winds between Verona Lake, Vanluven Lake and Howes Lake. At the community of Piccadilly, the former highway enters Central Frontenac Township and soon thereafter passes Godfrey.

North of Godfrey, the former route of Highway 38 travels around and east of Cole Lake. It passes through a barren stretch of forest for several kilometres before reaching the community of Parham, where through traffic must turn to remain on the route. It proceeds east to Tichborne, where it curves north and around the east side of Eagle Lake. It provides access to Camp Oconto, an all-girls overnight camp on Eagle Lake, then passes through the community of Oconto. After travelling through several more kilometres of forest, the former highway enters the village of Sharbot Lake via a causeway across Sharbot Lake. It meanders through the village before ending at Highway 7.

History 

Highway 38 was established in the mid-1930s shortly after the completion of Highway 7 between Madoc and Perth in August 1932.
The Department of Highways (DHO) assumed responsibility over the  Sharbot Lake Road on April 25, 1934,
which was gravel-surfaced north of Cataraqui and generally paralleled the K&P Railway. Beginning in downtown Kingston, it featured a  concurrency with Highway 2 along Princess Street to Cataraqui, where it then branched north along Sydenham Road and McIvor Road to the present-day Road 38.
The concurrency with Highway 2 was removed in 1954.

Following the assumption of the route, the DHO began work on several improvement projects. In 1935, a crossing was constructed over the Canadian Pacific Railway in Sharbot Lake.
This structure remained in place for 80 years until it was demolished in July 2015.
In 1936 the DHO began construction of the Verona–Hartington Diversion, which bypassed the original route of the highway along what is now Boyce Road, Quarry Road and Burnett Road. The  diversion was completed in early 1938, and the old routing decommissioned on January 10, 1938.

In 1954, construction of the Kingston Bypass of Highway 401 began.
Highway 38 was signed along this new road, which is now known as Midland Avenue. The old route to Cataraqui, which now featured an interchange with Highway 401, also remained signed as Highway 38.
For several years, Highway 38 forked in two at Highway 401. In 1960 construction began on a full interchange with the western fork as part of a larger project to build the eastbound lanes of Highway 401 to Odessa. Both were completed and opened on December 5, 1961.
The eastern fork was truncated at Highway 401 around this time;
it was decommissioned entirely by 1966, leaving only the western fork.
Highway 38 was now  in length, and would remain as such until the 1990s.

When Highway 38 was designated in 1934, only the concurrency with Highway 2 and the portion along Sydenham Road was paved, while the remainder was gravel-surfaced. The portion north to and including the Hartington–Verona Diversion was paved prior to the opening of the diversion in 1938.
Following World War II,  of the route from south of Tichbourne to Highway 7 was paved in 1946.
The remainder of the highway, between Verona and Tichbourne, was paved between 1950 and 1953.

As part of a series of budget cuts initiated by premier Mike Harris under his Common Sense Revolution platform in 1995, numerous highways deemed to no longer be of significance to the provincial network were decommissioned and responsibility for the routes transferred to a lower level of government, a process referred to as downloading. Highway 38 was deemed to serve a local function and was transferred to Frontenac County on January 1, 1998.
Since Frontenac County does not maintain roads,
the former highway is now maintained by South Frontenac Township, Central Frontenac Township and the City of Kingston, the latter of which separated from Frontenac County on the same day.
South Frontenac Township refers to its portion as Township Road38, while Kingston and Central Frontenac refer to their portions as Road38. However, locals still refer to the route as Highway 38.

Major intersections

See also
List of numbered roads in Frontenac County

References

External links 

 Highway 38 Pictures and Information
 Highway 38 – Length and Route

038
Transport in Kingston, Ontario